Yponomeuta madagascariensis is a moth of the family Yponomeutidae. It is only known from Madagascar.

The wingspan is about 18 mm.

External links
 Two New Species Of Yponomeutoid Moths (Lepidoptera, Yponomeutidae, Plutellidae) From Madagascar

Yponomeutidae
Moths of Madagascar
Moths of Africa
Moths described in 2003